The 1946 Howard Bison football team was an American football team that represented Howard University as a member of the Colored Intercollegiate Athletic Association (CIAA) during the 1946 college football season. In their second season under head coach Edward Jackson, the team compiled a 6–2–1 record and outscored opponents by a total of 101 to 85. 

The Dickinson System rated Howard in a tie for No. 16 among the black college football teams for 1946.

Schedule

References

Howard
Howard Bison football seasons
Howard Bison football